Rock, Rock, Rock can refer to

 Rock, Rock, Rock (film), a 1956 film
 Rock, Rock, Rock (soundtrack), the soundtrack of that film, now widely considered Chuck Berry's first album
 Rock, Rock, Rock (TV series), about the life of South Korean rock guitarist Kim Taewon